Malaya Kozlovka is a rural locality (a village) in Lavrovskoye Rural Settlement, Sudogodsky District, Vladimir Oblast, Russia. The population was 5 as of 2010.

Geography 
Malaya Kozlovka is located 11 km east of Sudogda (the district's administrative centre) by road. Kolesnya is the nearest rural locality.

References 

Rural localities in Sudogodsky District